Rosalie de Constant, (31 July 1758 Saint-Jean – 27 November 1834 Geneva) was a Swiss illustrator and naturalist.

She was the daughter of Samuel de Constant de Rebecque and Charlotte Pictet (herself a daughter of a professor of law at the Geneva Academy).
She left an important correspondence, notably with her cousin Benjamin Constant, as well as a painted herbarium with over 1,200 pages.

Life
Voltaire encouraged the marriage of her parents.
Doctors Jean Baumgartner (died 1790) and Théodore Tronchin (1709–1781) are also among their neighbors.
The Constant's, landowners, are linked to the great families of the region such as the Saussure, Chandieu, Charrière, Loys, and were very integrated in the social, cultural and economic life. Samuel and Charlotte had four children: Rosalie, Lisette (1759–1837), Juste (1760–1793) and Charles (1762–1835), later called "Charles the Chinese" because of his travels and stays in China between 1779 and 1793.

After the death of Charlotte in 1766, the family was in financial difficulties. Under these circumstances, Rosalie took on the role of elder sister, but broke her shoulder in an accident in 1767, which will leave her disabled all her life.
Rosalie will have a half brother born from the second marriage of her father, Victor (1773–1853), who is part of the Swiss Guard of Louis XVI and who narrowly escapes death at the Tuileries during the massacre of 10 August 1792.

Rosalie quickly took the habit of writing in notebooks (called Cahiers verts) with very different content: cooking recipes, personal remarks, verses, travel journal etc.

In the 1770s, the family moved closer to the Lausanne branch of the Constant family. Rosalie and her cousin, Benjamin Constant, became friends. Later on, they exchanged an important correspondence, which ended only with the death of Benjamin in 1830.

Because of his financial problems, Samuel settled in Lausanne in 1787, at the property of La Chablière. This belonged to the father of Benjamin, Juste de Constant, who lived in a neighboring property, Desert. The social, cultural and intellectual life of the Lausanne elite was then dynamic with the presences of Gibbon, Jacques-Georges Deyverdun, and Tissot. The city became an international attraction and, after the Revolution, a point of departure for the emigrants.

Rosalie also shared a strong friendship with her cousin Constance d'Hermenches (1755–1825), who became Constance de Cazenove d'Arlens after her marriage in 1787.
Constance had met the young Germaine de Staël, and Benjamin Constant met Germaine de Stael on September 18, 1794. Rosalie admired Germaine de Stael, but when the relationship between her cousin and Necker's daughter became tumultuous, she remained on the side of Benjamin, her confidante.

For about two years, between 1791 and 1793, Rosalie maintained an epistolary idyll with Jacques-Henri Bernardin de Saint-Pierre. But the author of Paul and Virginie ended their exchanges when he learns that Rosalie is poor and infirm.
Beginning in 1797, Rosalie remained with Madame de Charrière-Bavois, the first cousin of her father, and whose salon is one of the most important in Lausanne. Edward Gibbon, Jacques-Georges Deyverdun, Joseph-Michel-Antoine Servan or the future Madame de Montolieu met there.

Rosalie's passion for botany, drawing and painting is further enhanced by this context.
As early as 1795, Rosalie had begun a painted herbarium, which she would pursue until the end of her life, and which could be part of a wider current during the Enlightenment.
She was encouraged in her work by Mathieu de Montmorency, during a mountain trip.
The herbarium was a kind of refuge for Rosalie in the face of concerns about the precariousness of the family's financial situation.

As early as 1804, Rosalie had a long friendship with the novelist Claire de Duras, author of Ourika and also passionate about botany.

In 1819, Rosalie undertook a journey in the German-speaking part of Switzerland with her friends Sir Francis and Lady Drake from England. Her travel diary was published in French by "The Bibliothèque des arts" en 1964 with the title Un voyage en Suisse en 1919. 

From 1820 to her death in 1834, she lived successively in Lausanne, near Saint-Jean, and in Geneva. During her last years, with her brother Charles, she frequented Albertine Necker de Saussure (cousin of Germaine de Stael), Sismondi, Charles Victor of Bonstetten, Édouard Diodati, and Chateaubriand and his wife, with whom she found accommodation in Lausanne.

Rosalie did not marry, although she had been asked to marry at least twice, the second by General de Montesquiou.

References

1758 births
1834 deaths
18th-century botanists from the Republic of Geneva
Swiss naturalists
Swiss women illustrators
18th-century naturalists
19th-century naturalists
19th-century Swiss women scientists
18th-century Swiss women artists